Sex, America, Cheap Trick is a 1996 box set by the rock band Cheap Trick. It includes 17 previously unreleased songs (among them the earliest studio recording of the 1979 hit "I Want You to Want Me"), as well as the band's biggest hits. A color booklet is included.

Track listing
All songs written by Rick Nielsen except where noted. Many of the then-unreleased tracks would later also appear as bonus tracks on the reissues of the original albums on CD.

Disc one

Disc two

Disc three

Disc four

References

Cheap Trick compilation albums
1996 compilation albums
Epic Records compilation albums